Mars Hill Baptist Church, also known as Fries Memorial Moravian Church, is a historic African-American Baptist church located at Winston-Salem, Forsyth County, North Carolina.  It was built in 1915, and is a "T"-shaped brick building with corner tower in the Gothic Revival style. Also on the property is the parsonage; a one-story, pebble-dash finished Queen Anne style dwelling.  It has a high hipped roof, a central hipped dormer, and a hipped-roof full-front porch supported by fluted columns.  It was originally built for a white Moravian congregation, until the Mars Hill Baptist Church congregation purchased the building in 1944 for $4,000.

It was listed on the National Register of Historic Places in 1999.

References

African-American history in Winston-Salem, North Carolina
Baptist churches in North Carolina
Churches on the National Register of Historic Places in North Carolina
Gothic Revival church buildings in North Carolina
Queen Anne architecture in North Carolina
Churches completed in 1915
20th-century Baptist churches in the United States
Churches in Winston-Salem, North Carolina
National Register of Historic Places in Winston-Salem, North Carolina